Blake Lynch (born February 14, 1997) is an American football middle linebacker for the Arizona Cardinals of the National Football League (NFL). He played college football at Baylor.

College career
Born in Gilmer, Texas, Lynch attended Gilmer High School, where he played alongside future Vikings teammate Kris Boyd. After redshirting in his freshman year, he played college football for Baylor, where he made 32 career starts at five different positions (cornerback, linebacker, safety, wide receiver and running back). In a four-year college career, he accrued 673 receiving yards, four receiving touchdowns and 79 rushing yards.

Professional career

Minnesota Vikings
Lynch was signed by the Minnesota Vikings as an undrafted free agent following the 2020 NFL Draft on April 28, 2020. He was waived during final roster cuts on September 5, 2020, and signed to the team's practice squad the following day. He was elevated to the active roster on December 12 for the team's week 14 game against the Tampa Bay Buccaneers, and reverted to the practice squad after the game. He played 13 snaps on special teams, and his only statistical contribution was a downed punt at the end of the Vikings' first drive of the game. He was promoted to the active roster on December 16, 2020, and played in the game against the Chicago Bears. He played one defensive snap, contributing one tackle assist, and 16 special teams snaps, making one tackle on kick coverage in the game.

On August 30, 2022, Lynch was waived by the Vikings.

Arizona Cardinals
On October 18, 2022, Lynch was signed to the Arizona Cardinals practice squad. He signed a reserve/future contract on January 11, 2023.

References

External links
 Minnesota Vikings bio
 Baylor Bears football bio

1997 births
Living people
People from Gilmer, Texas
Players of American football from Texas
American football linebackers
American football defensive backs
Baylor Bears football players
Minnesota Vikings players
Arizona Cardinals players